Sportsnet Central is the flagship sports news program on Sportsnet in Canada. Originally known as Sportscentral and later Sportsnetnews, it was re-branded as Sportsnet Connected on January 1, 2007 with an emphasis on more local coverage of sports teams. Additionally, Rogers-owned Setanta Sports (now Sportsnet World) aired a version of the show called Setanta Connected (later Sportsnet World Connected), with an emphasis on international sports, although that was replaced with Soccer Central. Sportsnet Connected changed the look and format of its show on October 4, 2011. The title of the program was again renamed on October 8, 2014 as Sportsnet Central to coincide with the beginning of the 2014–15 NHL regular season.

Current Sportsnet Central anchors
Ben Ennis
Jesse Fuchs
Martine Gaillard
Faizal Khamisa
Danielle Michaud
Evanka Osmak
Ken Reid
Jesse Rubinoff
Eric Thomas

Former Sportsnet Central anchors
Carly Agro
R.J. Broadhead 
Hugh Burrill
Caroline Cameron
James Cybulski
Brendan Dunlop
Rob Faulds
Erin Hawksworth
Hazel Mae
Daren Millard
Jackie Redmond
Don Taylor
Jamie Thomas
Mike Toth

External links
 Channel Canada information about Sportsnet Connected
 Sportsnet's web site

1990s Canadian sports television series
Sportsnet shows
2000s Canadian sports television series
2010s Canadian sports television series